Stephen Kennedy or Steve Kennedy may refer to:
 Stephen Kennedy (actor) (born 1970), Northern Irish actor
 Stephen Kennedy (engineer) (born 1956), Canadian engineer
 Stephen P. Kennedy (1906-1978), New York City Police Commissioner
 Steve Kennedy (footballer) (born 1965), English footballer